The Hot Desk is a British music interview show that has been hosted by a number of presenters including Nicole Appleton, Melanie Blatt, Dave Berry, Emma Willis, Laura Whitmore, Sarah Jane Crawford and Alice Levine. The show was produced for ITV by UMTV.TV.

The Hot Desk first appeared on ITV Mobile in November 2007 and represented ITV Mobile's first made-for-mobile commission. Since 2008, it has been shown on ITV2. The show was launched with Mel Blatt and Nicole Appleton interviewing Liam Gallagher (who was in a relationship with Appleton at the time). Filmed on London's Hampstead Heath, Liam was less than complimentary about Peter Andre in his usual inimitable style.

Format
Since the show's early "edgy feel" mix of new bands and no-holds-barred style approach, the show became less focused on new talent and more celebrity-led. One format question asked to every guest was 'call, text or reject' where the guest is given three people related to their lives, one they call, one they have to text and the other they must reject.

At the end of each interview, the celebrity featured was asked to sign the "Hot Desk" with a marker pen. This is reminiscent of TFI Friday, the television show hosted by Chris Evans which ran from 1996 to 2000. When Evans finished his interviews, he would also ask the celebrity to sign the desk with a marker pen. This format provided the producer with great access to the biggest music stars and A-list celebrities.

Presenters

 Nicole Appleton (2007–2010)
 Melanie Blatt (2007–2010)
 Dave Berry (2008–2014, 2017)
 Emma Willis (2008–2014)
 Jayne Sharp (2011)
 Laura Whitmore (2012–2016)
 Alice Levine (2012–2013)
 Arazou Baker (2013)
 Dan O'Connell (2013)
 Melvin Odoom (2014, 2016)
 Rickie Haywood Williams (2014, 2016)
 Matt Willis (2014)
 Sarah-Jane Crawford (2014)
 Pixie Lott (2014)
 AJ Odudu (2015–2016)
 Poppy Jamie (2015–2016)
 Becca Dudley (2016)
 Maya Jama (2016)
 Roman Kemp (2016–2017)
 Vick Hope (2016)

Episodes

2007

2008

2009

2010

2011

2012

2013

2014

2015

2016

2017

References

External links

2007 British television series debuts
2017 British television series endings
ITV (TV network) original programming
English-language television shows
British music television shows